Emmaunuel Ugwu is an Anglican bishop in Nigeria: he is the emeritus Bishop of Awgu/Aninri.

Notes

Living people
Anglican bishops of Awgu/Aninri
21st-century Anglican bishops in Nigeria
Year of birth missing (living people)